"Cry for Me" is a song by Cuban-American singer Camila Cabello. It was released as the third single from Cabello's second studio album, Romance (2019), on October 4, 2019 by Epic Records and Syco Music.

Background and composition
In her announcement of the song, Cabello called the song one of her "favorites" and explained that it was written about "when your ex moves on faster than you and of course you want them to be happy but just..... not so fast". Two days later Cabello explained the track further more, saying "I wrote a song back when I was 16 called I’m Pissed Off You’re Happy, about a situation where someone and I broke up and sooner than I expected, they moved on, they were having fun and happy and dating and I was just like.... what the hell, that didn’t take very long. I took that idea and put it into this song, the feeling nobody likes to admit about feeling wild with jealousy". It was written by Camila Cabello, Ryan Tedder, Adam Feeney and Louis Bell. The song runs for three minutes and nine seconds.

Critical reception
Emily Zemler of Rolling Stone described the song as a "pop number" that takes on that feeling after a breakup where you want your ex to be just as miserable as you are".

Promotion
Cabello announced the track's release on social media on October 2, 2019.

Live performances
Camila first performed "Cry for Me" on Saturday Night Live, on October 12, 2019.

Credits and personnel
Credits adapted from the liner notes of Romance.

Publishing
 Published by Sony/ATV Songs LLC (BMI) o/b/o Sony/ATV Music Publishing (UK) LTD/Maidmetal Limited (PRS)/Milamoon Songs (BMI) / EMI Blackwood Music Inc. o/b/o EMI Music Publishing LTD (PRS)/MYNY Music (BMI)/Sony/ATV Songs LLC (BMI) o/b/o Sam Fam Beats (BMI), EMI April Music Inc. (ASCAP), Write Me a Song Publishing (GMR) admin. by Downtown Music Publishing LLC

Recording
 Recorded at Electric Feel Recording Studios, West Hollywood, California
 Mixed at Larrabee Studio, North Hollywood, California
 Mastered at the Mastering Palace, New York City, New York

Personnel

 Camila Cabello – lead vocals, songwriting
 Frank Dukes – songwriting, production
 Louis Bell – songwriting, vocals production, recording engineering
 Ryan Tedder – songwriting
 Manny Marroquin – mixing
 Chris Galland – assistant mixing
 Dave Kutch – mastering

Charts

Certifications

Release history

References

2019 singles
2019 songs
Camila Cabello songs
Songs written by Camila Cabello
Songs written by Ryan Tedder
Songs written by Frank Dukes
Songs written by Louis Bell
Song recordings produced by Louis Bell
Song recordings produced by Frank Dukes